Julius Lewis was an Anglican priest in the last decades of the 19th century and the first two of the 20th in Australia.

Ordained in 1884 he began his career with  curacies at Hamilton, Victoria, and Portland. In 1881, he became vicar of Maryborough then archdeacon of Tamworth, New South Wales, and then Armidale. His final appointment was as Dean of Ballarat in 1914, a post he held until his death in 1920.

References

Anglican archdeacons in Australia
Deans of Ballarat
1920 deaths
Year of birth missing